Issaka Samaké is a Malian football player playing defense for Horoya AC and the Malian Football Federation.

International career
In January 2014, coach Djibril Dramé, invited him to be a part of the Mali squad for the 2014 African Nations Championship. He helped the team reach the quarter finals where they lost to Zimbabwe by two goals to one.

International goals
Scores and results list Mali's goal tally first.

References

1994 births
Living people
Malian footballers
Mali international footballers
Association football defenders
Stade Malien players
Malian Première Division players
2014 African Nations Championship players
2016 African Nations Championship players
2020 African Nations Championship players
21st-century Malian people
Mali A' international footballers
Malian expatriate sportspeople in Guinea
Malian expatriate footballers
Expatriate footballers in Guinea
Horoya AC players